The women's 10 kilometre open water competition of the 2018 Pan Pacific Swimming Championships was held on 14 August at the Hojyo Beach.

Results
The race was started at 07:05.

Unlimited number of swimmers are permitted per country, but only the top two swimmers from each country was classified.

References

2018 Pan Pacific Swimming Championships